The 1978 regulations established five categories of Amateur radio licence in India. The regulations were revised in 2009 and now only two categories are issued.

Categories in 1978 
The Indian Wireless Telegraphs (Amateur Service) Rules, 1978 listed five licence categories:

 Advanced Amateur Wireless Telegraph Station License
 Amateur Wireless Telegraph Station License, Grade–I
 Amateur Wireless Telegraph Station License, Grade–II
 Restricted Amateur Wireless Telegraph Station License
 Short Wave Listener's Amateur Wireless Telegraph Station License

To obtain a licence in the first four categories, candidates had to pass the Amateur Station Operator's Certificate examination. This examination is held monthly in Delhi, Mumbai, Kolkata and Chennai, every two months in Ahmedabad, Nagpur and Hyderabad, and every four months in some smaller cities. The examination consists of two 50-mark written sections: Radio theory and practice, Regulations; and a practical test consisting of a demonstration of Morse code proficiency in both sending and receiving. After passing the examination, the candidate must then clear Local Police and Central Home Department verification. After clearance, the WPC grants the licence along with the user-chosen call sign (if available). This procedure on an average takes 12 months.

Grade II Restricted  and Grade II are now merged with Restricted Grade since 13 August 2010. Grade 1 and Advance Grade have been merged with General Grade.

2005 and 2009 Amendments
In a 2005 notification, the WPC proposed an amendment to the 1978 Amateur Service Rules in the rationalization of the licence categories to only two: the Amateur Wireless Telegraph Station Licence (General) and the Amateur Wireless Telegraph Station Licence (Restricted).

The Indian Wireless Telegraph (Amateur Service) Rules, 2009 lists two licence categories:
 Amateur Wireless Telegraph Station Licence, General
 Amateur Wireless Telegraph Station Licence, Restricted

By the 2009 Amendment, Licences can be renewed up to twenty years for a fee of Rs.1000/- and lifelong for Rs.2000/-

To obtain a licence, candidates must clear the Amateur Station Operator's Certificate exam, held monthly at the four metropolitan cities (Delhi, Mumbai, Kolkata and Chennai), and quarterly in other smaller towns. The exam consists of two 100-mark written sections: Radio theory and practice, Regulations; and a practical consisting of demonstration of Morse proficiency (sending and receiving).

See also
 Amateur radio in India
 Amateur Station Operator's Certificate
 VU Hams Social Network

References

Amateur radio in India
Amateur radio licensing